The 2012 Australian Formula Ford Championship was a CAMS sanctioned national motor racing title for drivers of Formula Ford racing cars. It was the 43rd national series for Formula Fords to be held in Australia and the 20th to carry the Australian Formula Ford Championship name. The championship was contested over an eight round series which began on 16 March at the Melbourne Grand Prix Circuit and ended on 18 November at Winton Motor Raceway. Australian Formula Ford Management Pty. Ltd. was appointed as the Category Manager by CAMS for the series, which was officially known as the "2012 Australian Formula Ford Championship for the Ford Fiesta Cup".

The championship was won by Jack Le Brocq driving a Mygale SJ12A for the CAMS Rising Stars / Minda Motorsport team.

Teams and drivers
The following teams and drivers contested the 2012 Australian Formula Ford Championship. All teams and drivers were Australian-registered.

All cars were fitted with a 1600cc Ford Duratec engine, as required by the regulations.

Calendar
The championship was contested over an eight round series with three races per round. All races were held in Australia.

Points system
Championship points were awarded on a 20–16–14–12–10–8–6–4–2–1 basis to the top ten classified finishers in each race. An additional point was awarded to the driver gaining pole position for the first race at each round.

Results

Note: The driver who attained pole position for race one of the round is indicated by bold font applied to his race one result.

References

External links
  www.formulaford.com.au – Official website, as archived at web.archive.org on 13 December 2012
 2012 Racing Results Archive at www.natsoft.com.au

Australian Formula Ford Championship seasons
Formula Ford Championship